Hille may refer to:

Places
Hille (Belgium), a hamlet
Hille, Germany, a town in the Minden-Lübbecke district in the state of North Rhine-Westphalia, Germany
Hille, Agder, an island in Lindesnes municipality in Agder county, Norway

Other uses
Hille (furniture), a British furniture manufacturer
Hille equation, an equation that relates the maximum ionic conductance of an ion channel to its length and radius
Hille IF, a Swedish football club located in Gävle in Gävleborg County

People with the name

Surname
Anastasia Hille (born 1965), an English film, television and theatre actress
Arnoldus Hille (1829–1919), a Norwegian Lutheran Bishop
Bertil Hille (born 1940), an American professor in the Department of Physiology and Biophysics at the University of Washington
David Hille (born 1981), a former Australian-rules footballer
Carl Einar Hille (1894–1980), an American mathematician
Heinz Hille (1891–1954), a German screenwriter, film producer, and director
Henk Hille (born 1959), a Dutch former ice hockey player
Henrik Greve Hille (1881–1946), a Norwegian clergyman
Howard Hille Johnson (1846–1913), an American blind educator and founder of the West Virginia Schools for the Deaf and Blind
Kristin Hille Valla (born 1944), a Norwegian politician for the Centre Party
Sebastian Hille (born 1980), a German football player and coach
Sigurd Hille (born 1950), a Norwegian politician for the Conservative Party
Veda Hille (born 1968), a Canadian singer and songwriter

Given name
Hille Darjes (born 1944), German actress and speaker
Hille Perl (born 1965), German virtuoso performer of the viola da gamba and lirone
Hille Sarapuu (born 1937), Estonian speed skater, cyclist and motorcycle rider